The 2012 Japanese Super Cup was held on 3 March 2012 between the 2011 J. League champions Kashiwa Reysol and the 2011 Emperor's Cup winner F.C. Tokyo. Kashiwa Reysol won the match 2–1 in regulation time.

Background
This was the first time both teams had participated in the competition. Kashiwa, having won its first League title since 1972 (when no Super Cup was played) and FC Tokyo, having become the third club to win both the second-tier title and the Emperor's Cup since Yamaha (Júbilo Iwata) in 1982, both had qualified to the Asian Champions League by virtue of winning their titles.

Match

See also
2011 J. League Division 1
2011 Emperor's Cup

References

Japanese Super Cup
Super
Kashiwa Reysol matches
FC Tokyo matches
March 2012 sports events in Japan